Baiziwan Station is a station on Line 7 of the Beijing Subway towards the southern part of the city.

It is located in Chaoyang District along Guangqu Road east of the East 4th Ring Road Middle on the north side of the former Beijing Chemical Engineering 2nd Plant.

Station layout 
The station has an underground island platform.

Exits 
There are 4 exits, lettered A1, A2, A3, and B. Exit A1 is accessible.

References

Railway stations in China opened in 2014
Beijing Subway stations in Chaoyang District